USS West Alsek (ID-3119) was a cargo ship in the United States Navy during World War I. She had been built as SS West Alsek for the United States Shipping Board (USSB) as part of the West boats, cargo ships built on the West Coast of the United States. She sailed on two voyages for the U.S. Navy before she was decommissioned after the Armistice.

West Alsek was selected for a test program by the addition of coal pulverizers—units that crushed coal and mixed it with air for injection into the boilers. She became the first steamship to cross the Atlantic ocean depending solely on pulverized coal. Test results showed that she sailed faster and used less coal than before the conversion. West Alsek was later abandoned by the USSB and scrapped in 1933.

Design and construction 
The West ships were cargo ships of similar size and design built by several shipyards on the West Coast of the United States for the United States Shipping Board (USSB) for emergency use during World War I. All were given names that began with the word West, like West Alsek, named, in part, after the Alsek River in Alaska. West Alsek was one of some 24 West ships built by Skinner & Eddy of Seattle, Washington.

West Alsek (Skinner & Eddy No. 22, USSB No. 87) was launched on 4 May 1918 and delivered to the United States Navy upon completion later in the month. West Alsek was built in a total of 78 working days, 92 calendar days, and was tied with three other ships for tenth place on a list of the ten fastest constructed ocean-going vessels compiled in 1920. Skinner & Eddy received a $25,000 bonus for completing the ship early.

The ship had a single triple-expansion steam engine powered by three coal-fired boilers that generated  and drove her single screw propeller, and moved the ship at a  pace.

Military career 
USS West Alsek (ID-3119) was commissioned into the Naval Overseas Transportation Service (NOTS) on 4 June. West Alsek took on an initial load of 7,067 tons of flour and departed the Pacific Northwest on 15 June. After transiting the Panama Canal, she reached New York on 16 July.

At sundown, shortly before 18:00, one of three torpedoes from German submarine U-90 struck Montanan, while another torpedo from U-107 hit West Bridge, which was already adrift with engine trouble. Meanwhile, West Alsek and the other surviving ships of the convoy continued on and arrived at Verdon-sur-mer on 18 August.

After unloading her cargo of flour and returning to the United States, West Alsek next sailed on 27 October in convoy to Quiberon and Nantes. West Alsek unloaded her cargo in Nantes from 15 November—four days after the Armistice—to 30 December. Sailing for New York on that date, West Alsek arrived there on 19 January 1919. She was decommissioning on 27 January and returned to the USSB.

Civilian career 
Little is known about West Alseks subsequent civilian career until early 1929. In February of that year, West Alsek, still under USSB ownership, was selected for the addition of pulverized coal-fired boilers for testing purposes. Coal pulverizers would take coal—often cheaper, inferior grades normally unsuitable for marine use—and grind them into coal dust. This dust would then be mixed with air and automatically injected into the boilers without the need for hand-feeding. West Alsek entered the Todd Brooklyn shipyard to undergo the conversion in late February.

Upon completion of the conversion work, West Alsek was taken out for trials over two passes on a  course on 19 June. Representatives from the USSB, the Navy Department, the United States Coast Guard, the Cunard Line, and Todd and other shipbuilders were on board—some 125 guests in all.

After returning her guests to New York, West Alsek sailed to Baltimore, Maryland, for operation by the Oriole Line. She sailed for Cardiff, becoming the first ship depending only on pulverized coal to cross the Atlantic, and back to Baltimore on 18 August. Early results showed that in addition to making the transatlantic crossings about 10% faster than she had before, West Alsek used about 30% less coal during the voyage. West Alsek continued to be a test platform for assessing the pulverized coal system during a voyage to Glasgow, her second for the Oriole Line.

No information on West Alseks career after the coal pulverizing tests is available, but it is known that she was abandoned by the USSB, and scrapped in the fourth quarter of 1933.

Notes

References

Bibliography

External links 
 

 

Design 1013 ships
Design 1013 ships of the United States Navy
Ships built by Skinner & Eddy
1918 ships
World War I merchant ships of the United States
World War I cargo ships of the United States